Aminata Sininta (born December 23, 1985 in Bamako) is a Malian women's basketball player. Sininta represented Mali, and competed as part of  the women's national basketball team at the 2008 Summer Olympics in Beijing. During the tournament, she scored a total of twenty-four points in five group play games, including thirteen against the United States in the third match.

Sininta is also a member of Djoliba AC women's basketball team in Bamako.

References

External links
FIBA Women's Basketball Profile
NBC Olympics Profile

1985 births
Living people
Malian women's basketball players
Olympic basketball players of Mali
Basketball players at the 2008 Summer Olympics
Sportspeople from Bamako
21st-century Malian people